Daniel Abraham was an Anglican bishop in the Church of South India: he was the Bishop of Tirunelveli from 1975 to 1984.

References

Anglican bishops of Tinnevelly
21st-century Anglican bishops in India
Indian bishops
Indian Christian religious leaders